Sefidar or Safidar may refer to:
 Safidar, Chaharmahal and Bakhtiari
 Sefidar, Baft, Kerman Province
 Sefidar, Kohgiluyeh and Boyer-Ahmad
 Sefidar, Tehran
 Sefidar Rural District, in Fars Province

See also
 Sefiddar, Qazvin Province